South Cape may refer to:
South Cape (Indonesia), on the island of Borneo
South Cape, New Guinea, a point of land in Milne Bay Province near the Brumer Islands
South Cape / Whiore, on the south coast of Stewart Island / Rakiura, New Zealand
Taukihepa/Big South Cape Island, an offshore island of New Zealand
Sørkapp, Svalbard, Norway
South Cape Municipality, Western Cape, South Africa
South Cape Beach State Park, a state park located in Mashpee, Massachusetts, US
South Cape May, New Jersey, a borough that once existed in Cape May County, New Jersey, US

Other uses
South Cape Halt, a stop on the Manx Electric Railway

See also
South West Cape (disambiguation)